Léon Gabrial Schäfer (born 13 June 1997) is a German Paralympic athlete who competes in mainly sprinting and long jump events at international level events and is a current world record holder in the men's long jump T63. He has represented Germany at the 2016 Summer Paralympics. He finished in fourth place at the men's long jump T42 where he narrowly missed the bronze medal and will be representing Germany at the 2020 Summer Paralympics in Tokyo, Japan.

When Schäfer was twelve years old, he went ice skating and fell and skidded along the ice. He noticed that a bump was visible on his right leg that he injured after his fall on ice, he went to see a doctor and got a biopsy of his shin bone and two months later, it was revealed that he had malignant bone cancer. After the diagnosis, he started chemotherapy and they operated on the affected bone part of his shin and inserted an iron rod but his foot didn't accept the rod and it developed gangrene and he ended up having part of his right leg to be amputated.

References

External links
 
 

1997 births
Living people
German male sprinters
German male long jumpers
German male high jumpers
Paralympic athletes of Germany
Athletes (track and field) at the 2016 Summer Paralympics
Athletes (track and field) at the 2020 Summer Paralympics
Medalists at the World Para Athletics Championships
Sportspeople from Hanover
Sportspeople from Leverkusen
Sportspeople from Bremen